The 2002 Great Yarmouth Borough Council election took place on 2 May 2002 to elect members of Great Yarmouth Borough Council in Norfolk, England. One third of the council was up for election and the Conservative Party stayed in overall control of the council.

After the election, the composition of the council was:
Conservative 28
Labour 20

Election result

Ward results

References

2002 English local elections
2002
2000s in Norfolk